Cylindrophyllum is a genus of flowering plants belonging to the family Aizoaceae.

Its native range is South African Republic.

Species:

Cylindrophyllum calamiforme 
Cylindrophyllum comptonii 
Cylindrophyllum hallii 
Cylindrophyllum obsubulatum 
Cylindrophyllum tugwelliae

References

Aizoaceae
Aizoaceae genera